Nancy Reynolds is the director of research at the George Balanchine Foundation and a 2013 recipient of a Bessie award for Outstanding Service to the Field of Dance. Reynolds is a former dancer with the New York City Ballet. She is the author of several books on dance including No Fixed Points: Dance in the Twentieth Century (with Malcolm McCormick). Shelley C. Berg, writing in the Dance Research Journal, called the book an "invaluable contribution to the literature of dance history" and that the authors had succeeded in "capturing the vitality of performance".

References

External links
 Nancy Reynolds collection Jerome Robbins Dance Division, The New York Public Library for the Performing Arts

Living people
American ballerinas
Bessie Award winners
Year of birth missing (living people)
Place of birth missing (living people)
21st-century American women